The 1944 United States presidential election in Texas took place on November 7, 1944, as part of the 1944 United States presidential election. State voters chose 23 electors to represent the state in the Electoral College, which chose the president and vice president.

Incumbent Democratic President Franklin D. Roosevelt won Texas in a landslide, taking 71.42% of the state's vote to Republican Thomas E. Dewey's 16.64%. The Texas Regulars, a group of conservative Democrats who opposed Roosevelt's New Deal and ran a ticket of unpledged electors, took 11.77% of the vote. As of 2020, this is the last time that Texas had voted Democratic in conservative elections.

Background

As a former Confederate state, Texas had a history of Jim Crow laws, disenfranchisement of African-American and Mexican-American populations, and single-party Democratic rule. The only exceptions to this were a few local governments in Unionist German-American counties (chiefly Gillespie and Kendall) in Central Texas. Since 1930, no Republicans had served in either house of the Texas Legislature, and Democratic candidates for federal office routinely won the state by an overwhelming margin (Franklin Roosevelt won more than 87% of Texas' ballots in both 1932 and 1936).
Many of Texas's officeholders were highly critical of Roosevelt's decision in 1940 to replace conservative Texan John Nance Garner with liberal Northerner Henry A. Wallace as his running mate. This antipathy grew far worse when, in March 1944, the landmark case of Smith v. Allwright ruled unconstitutional the white primaries upon which the politics of Texas and most other Southern states were based. The result was that Texas' oil and natural gas industries became powerfully opposed to the re-nomination of President Roosevelt, and called for the reversal of New Deal policies alongside the "return of states' rights" and "restoration of white supremacy".

At first, these anti-New Deal Democrats attempted to take over the state Democratic organization, send anti-Roosevelt delegates to the national convention, and prevent the seating of Black delegates at that convention. When this failed, and Roosevelt loyalists maintained control of the state Democratic delegation, the anti-New Deal groups formed the "Texas Regulars", led by Merritt Gibson, who would later join Strom Thurmond's Dixiecrat movement.

Although their electors were not pledged to any candidate, the Regulars were able to gain access to the ballot in September. Support from Governor Pappy O'Daniel, however, failed to obscure that the Regulars' support was largely confined to affluent urban areas and a few traditional plantation districts, plus the fact that some of their support came from the state's small traditional Republican presidential vote. Consequently, Texas again voted overwhelming for incumbent President Roosevelt and his new running mate, Missouri Senator Harry S. Truman. Washington County nonetheless gave the Regulars 52 percent of its ballots and thus became the first county in the nation to go for a third party since 1924, when Robert La Follette won over 16% of the national vote and more than a sixth of the nation's counties, Roosevelt remains the most recent Democratic presidential candidate to carry Texas more than once.

Results

Results by county

See also
 United States presidential elections in Texas

Notes

References

Texas
1944
1944 Texas elections